Fitz W. Guerin (March 17, 1846 – July 11, 1903) was a recipient of the Medal of Honor in the American Civil War. On returning to civilian life, he became a successful society photographer in St. Louis, Missouri.

Early life
He was born in New York City, New York. At 13, he set out on his own and worked for the Merrill Drug Company in St. Louis and Western Union.

American Civil War
He joined the Union Army as a teenager and served under Generals William Tecumseh Sherman, Nathaniel Lyon and Ulysses S. Grant. For his actions in conjunction with Sergeant Henry A. Hammel and Private Joseph Pesch on April 28 and 29, 1863, Private Guerin was awarded the Medal of Honor on March 10, 1896.

Medal of Honor citation
The President of the United States of America, in the name of Congress, takes pleasure in presenting the Medal of Honor to Private Fitz W. Guerin, United States Army, for extraordinary heroism on April 28 & 29, 1863, while serving with Battery A, 1st Missouri Light Artillery, in action at Grand Gulf, Mississippi. With two comrades Private Guerin voluntarily took position on board the steamer Cheeseman, in charge of all the guns and ammunition of the battery, and remained in charge of the same for a considerable time while the steamer was unmanageable and subjected to a heavy fire from the enemy.
General Orders: Date of Issue: March 10, 1896

Action Date: April 28 & 29, 1863

Service: Army

Rank: Private

Company: Battery A

Division: 1st Missouri Light Artillery

Photography career
After the war, he returned to St. Louis and did menial jobs at a photographic gallery. He found better pay stringing telegraph wire for a railroad, but returned to photography, going into partnership and setting up Remington, Guerin, and Mills Gallery in Ottumwa, Iowa. He was eventually bought out and returned to St. Louis, where he worked for several established photographers, learning the trade.

Finally, in 1876, he set up shop on his own. When he won an award at the 1878 Paris World's Fair, he became an overnight success. He established a reputation, received international recognition for his portraits, and was several times president of the National Photographic Society. He opened several more galleries in the city, owning a total of six over his 27-year career.

Pioneering women photographers Emme and Mayme Gerhard studied with him for three years. When he retired in January 1903, he sold his studio to them.

Guerin died of a heart attack on July 11, 1903. He was buried at Bellefontaine Cemetery in St. Louis, the same resting place as his Medal of Honor co-recipients, Hammel and Pesch.

A 1982 American Heritage magazine article labeled him a "turbid Victorian hack", though it did concede he was technically gifted. Some of his photographs are held by the Library of Congress.

References

External links

1885 portrait of Guerin and two others, Missouri History Museum
Midwestern Fantasia, a St. Louis Magazine article displaying six of his photographs

1846 births
1903 deaths
American Civil War recipients of the Medal of Honor
Photographers from New York (state)
Military personnel from New York City
People of New York (state) in the American Civil War
Burials at Bellefontaine Cemetery
United States Army Medal of Honor recipients